Hippomane spinosa  is a plant species in the family Euphorbiaceae.

It was described by Linnaeus in 1753. In Haitian Creole, the plant is known as pomme zombi (zombie apple), and in Dominican Spanish, it is known as manzanillo (chamomile). Like the related manchineel (H. mancinella), its toxicity makes it resistant to deforestation by locals.

Distribution and habitat
The plant is endemic to the island of Hispaniola in the Caribbean (in the Dominican Republic and Haiti). It is found in the Hispaniolan dry forests ecoregion.

See also

References

External links

Hippomaneae
Flora of the Dominican Republic
Flora of Haiti
Plants described in 1753
Taxa named by Carl Linnaeus